The term Jacob's ladder, used on a ship, applies to two kinds of rope ladders.

The first is a flexible hanging ladder. It consists of vertical ropes or chains supporting horizontal, historically round and wooden, rungs. Today, flat runged flexible ladders are also called Jacob's ladders. The name is commonly used without the apostrophe (Jacobs ladder).

They are used to allow access over the side of ships and as a result Pilot ladders are often incorrectly referred to as Jacob's ladders. A pilot ladder has specific regulations on step size, spacing and the use of spreaders. It is the use of spreaders in a pilot ladder that distinguishes it from a Jacob's ladder. 

Spreaders are long treads that extend well past the vertical ropes to stop the ladder from twisting about its long axis (possible when a ship rolls and the ladder is no longer in contact with the ship's side) with the person possibly becoming trapped between the ship's side and the ladder. When not being used, the ladder is stowed away (usually rolled up) rather than left hanging. On late 19th-century warships this kind of ladder would replace the normal fixed ladders on deck during battle. These and railings would be removed and replaced with Jacob's ladders and ropes while preparing for battle the days before. This was done to prevent them from blocking line of sight or turning into shrapnel when hit by enemy shells.

The second applies to a kind of ladder found on square rigged ships. To climb above the lower mast to the topmast and above, sailors must get around the top, a platform projecting from the mast. Although on many ships the only way round was the overhanging futtock shrouds, modern-day tall ships often provide an easier vertical ladder from the ratlines as well. This is the Jacob's ladder.

While they were a popular way of boarding a vessel or carrying out shipside maintenance during the era of wooden ships and even as recently as the 1950s, their use today on board modern merchant ships is minimal due to obvious safety issues. Today, Jacob's ladders are used only to board lifeboats and liferafts and as a draft ladder.

References

Sailing ship components
Vertical transport devices
Watercraft components